Mark Lawrence Bavis (March 13, 1970 – September 11, 2001) was an American Hockey League left winger.

Biography

Born in Roslindale, Massachusetts on March 13, 1970, he started his career playing hockey while attending Boston University. After he graduated, he played with the Providence Bruins and Fredericton Canadiens in the American Hockey League, then the South Carolina Stingrays in the ECHL, previously the East Coast Hockey League. Bavis was also a scout with the Los Angeles Kings.

Death
On September 11, 2001, Bavis was traveling from Boston to Los Angeles aboard United Airlines Flight 175 when it was hijacked and deliberately flown into the South Tower of the World Trade Center, killing everyone onboard. He was accompanied on the flight by Garnet "Ace" Bailey, director of pro scouting for the Los Angeles Kings. Both are memorialized at the South Pool of the National September 11 Memorial on Panel S-3.

He is the namesake of the Mark Bavis Leadership Foundation.

Career statistics

Source: NHL.com

References

1970 births
2001 deaths
American ice hockey coaches
American terrorism victims
Boston University Terriers men's ice hockey players
Filmed killings
Fredericton Canadiens players
Ice hockey coaches from Massachusetts
Los Angeles Kings scouts
New York Rangers draft picks
Providence Bruins players
Terrorism deaths in New York (state)
South Carolina Stingrays players
United Airlines Flight 175
Victims of aviation accidents or incidents in the United States
Victims of the September 11 attacks
People murdered in New York City
Male murder victims
People from Roslindale
American men's ice hockey left wingers
Ice hockey players from Massachusetts